Ignace Jay Gelb (October 14, 1907, in Tarnau, Austria-Hungary (now Tarnów, Poland) – December 22, 1985, in Chicago, Illinois) was a Polish-American ancient historian and Assyriologist who pioneered the scientific study of writing systems.

Early life
Born in Tarnów, Austria-Hungary (now Poland), he earned his PhD from the University of Rome in 1929, then went to the University of Chicago where he was a professor of Assyriology until his death.

Contribution
Although writing systems have been studied for centuries by linguists, Gelb is widely regarded as the first scientific practitioner of the study of scripts, and coined the term grammatology to refer to the study of writing systems. In A Study of Writing (1952), he suggested that scripts evolve in a single direction, from logographic scripts to syllabaries to alphabets. This historical typology has been criticized as overly simplistic, forcing the data to fit the model and ignoring exceptional cases. Gelb's typology has since been refined by Peter T. Daniels and others.

Gelb had contributed significantly to the decipherment of the Anatolian hieroglyphs (formerly often referred to as 'Hittite hieroglyphs'), having published 3 volumes of studies on the subject.

In the course of his career, he published over 20 books, that have been translated into many languages, and over 250 scientific articles.

View of the Maya
Gelb believed that the Maya hieroglyphs did not qualify as true writing capable of representing language, which has now been disproven following the decipherment of the Maya script.

Work in Assyriology
Gelb's work in Assyriology focused on publishing editions of Akkadian texts and a grammar and dictionary of Old Akkadian. He became editor of the Chicago Assyrian Dictionary in 1947 and continued work on the project until his death. His other important works include works on Mesopotamian land tenure and sales, metrology, and other aspects of economic and social history.

Gelb, supported by Assyriologist Aage Westenholz, differentiated three stages of Old Akkadian: that of the pre-Sargonic era, that of the Akkadian empire, and that of the Ur III period.

He was a fellow of the American Academy of Arts and Sciences (1968) and of the British Academy (1978), a member of the Accademia Nazionale dei Lincei, and in 1975 he was elected as a member of the prestigious American Philosophical Society. Additionally, from 1965 to 1966 he was president of the American Oriental Society.

Notes

References
 Leichty, Erle. 1998. Ignace J. Gelb (14 October 1907 - 22 December 1985). Proceedings of the American Philosophical Society 142(4): 668–670.
 Marquis Who Was Who in America, vol. 5, 1986–1989.
Ignace J Gelb, Hittite hieroglyphic monuments. Chicago : University of Chicago Press, 1939. (University of Chicago Oriental Institute publications, v. 45.) 
Ignace J Gelb, A study of writing. Chicago : University of Chicago Press, 1963

20th-century American historians
American male non-fiction writers
American Assyriologists
Fellows of the American Academy of Arts and Sciences
Fellows of the British Academy
Members of the American Philosophical Society
University of Chicago faculty
Linguists from the United States
Jews from Galicia (Eastern Europe)
American people of Polish-Jewish descent
People from Tarnów
1907 births
1985 deaths
20th-century American archaeologists
20th-century linguists
20th-century American male writers
Corresponding Fellows of the British Academy
Polish expatriates in Italy
Polish emigrants to the United States